Bhakta Ramadas (Kannada: ಭಕ್ತ ರಾಮದಾಸ್) is a 1948 Indian Kannada film, directed by Kemparaj Urs and produced by D. Shankar Singh. The film stars Kemparaj Urs, Sumathi Kashinath and Vimalananda Das in the lead roles. The film has musical score by P. Kalinga Rao.

Cast
Kemparaj Urs as Ramadas
Sumathi Kashinath
Vimalananda Das

References

External links
 

1940s Kannada-language films
Indian black-and-white films